Debra Ann Crew (born December 20, 1970) is the president of Diageo North America. She is also a board member of Mondelez International, and the former president and chief executive officer of R. J. Reynolds Tobacco Company. She previously held senior management positions at PepsiCo, Mars, Incorporated, and Dreyer's.

Education and military service
Crew earned her bachelor's degree from the University of Denver, and her MBA from the University of Chicago Booth School of Business.

She served in the United States Army from 1993 to 1997 in the field of military intelligence, achieving the rank of captain.

Business career
Crew began her business career at Kraft Foods in 1997, where she filled a number of management positions. After seven years at Kraft, she moved to Dreyer's, a subsidiary of Nestlé, where she worked from 2004 to 2008, rising to Senior Vice President of Marketing, Frozen Snacks. From 2008 to 2010 she was General Manager and Chief Marketing Officer of Petcare US, at Mars, Incorporated.

Crew joined PepsiCo in April 2010 as president, Western European Region, headquartered in Geneva. In August 2012 she was named to the newly created position of President of Pepsico Americas Beverages, which incorporated responsibility for the North American operations of the Gatorade and Tropicana brands, the Latin America Beverages operation, the North America warehouse sales operation, and the Beverage Growth Ventures Group. In August 2014 she was named president and General Manager of PepsiCo North America Nutrition.

In October 2014 Crew departed PepsiCo to become president and Chief Commercial Officer of the R.J. Reynolds Tobacco Company. She had been a director of the company since December 2013. The switch from the food to cigarette industry surprised observers, as well as the timing, since she had headed PepsiCo's North America Nutrition for only two months. In September 2015 her title changed to president and COO. As COO she oversaw $8.6 billion of the company's estimated $10.7 billion in post-merger sales.

On January 1, 2017 Crew became the CEO of Reynolds American, taking over from former CEO Susan Cameron. She is one of the few women CEOs of a major American  tobacco company, in what was an unusual transition in which a major company appoints two women CEOs consecutively.

In April 2019, Crew was appointed a non-executive director to Diageo's board. In July 2020, she replaced Deirde Mahlan as president of Diageo North America.

Memberships
In 2013, Crew was named to the board of directors of Stanley Black & Decker.

Honors and recognition
She was named to the Fortune list of the 50 Most Powerful Women in Business in 2014 and 2015. Crew has been named four times to Fortune magazine's list of the 50 Most Powerful Women in Business, ranking No. 44 in 2014, No. 46 in 2015, No. 47 in 2016 and No. 34 in 2017.

See also
List of women CEOs of Fortune 500 companies

References

R. J. Reynolds Tobacco Company people
PepsiCo people
Women corporate directors
American corporate directors
American women business executives
20th-century American businesspeople
20th-century American businesswomen
21st-century American businesspeople
21st-century American businesswomen
University of Denver alumni
University of Chicago Booth School of Business alumni
1970 births
Living people
United States Army officers
American chief operating officers
American chief executives of Fortune 500 companies
American women chief executives